Menotti Augusto Serse Lerro (22 February 1980) is an Italian poet, writer, playwright, librettist and academic, born in Omignano, Salerno. His work explores matters of social alienation and existentialism, the physicality and vulnerability of the body, the interpretation of memories, the meaning of objects and the philosophical importance of human identity. In 2015 he published Donna Giovanna, l'ingannatrice di Salerno, an innovative feminine and bisexual version of the mythical figure of Don Juan, El Burlador de Sevilla, while in 2018 he wrote Il Dottor Faust, an original version of the character of Faust. In addition he is the author of a New Manifesto of Arts and the founder of the Empathic movement (Empathism) that arose in the South of Italy at the beginning of 2020.

Education and career
Lerro studied English and Spanish languages and literatures at University of Salerno, starting in 2000, and received his degree in 2004. During this time he spent seven months in Oxford as an exchange student.
In 2006, after working one year in Milan for Mondadori publishing house, he received a scholarship from the University of Salerno to study abroad and began his masters' degree in “The Body and Representation” at the University of Reading under the supervision of Carolyn Williams Lyle. He later received the expert status of “Cultore della Materia” at the University of Salerno and in 2010 became visiting scholar at the University of Reading, where he undertook postgraduate teaching. Later, after completing his PhD in English and Spanish literature at the University of Salerno, he became a visiting scholar at the University of Warwick (2014) and at the University of Edinburgh (2020).
He taught English Culture and Civilization and English Literature at Ciels University of Milan for four years (2014–2018) before moving to Padua to teach the same subjects. In addition, he collaborated and taught lessons at the Accademia di Belle Arti di Brera and IULM University.
Moreover, he received a degree in Italian Studies (Lettere, Sapere Umanistico e Formazione).

Enrolled in the register of journalists since 2005, in 2022 he started writing opinion pieces for the Italian newspaper Affari Italiani.

Critical response to his literary work
According to Andrew Mangham "Menotti Lerro is one of the most interesting poets in modern-day Europe".
In 2009, Mangham wrote that Lerro "was described by one of Italy’s most influential critics, Giorgio Bàrberi Squarotti, as a writer of no insignificant importance.
Lerro published poetry has received reviews.

One of his 2015 dramas became the basis for a critical volume about the figure of a female and bisexual Don Giovanni, first performed at the Biblioteca Marucelliana. Donna Giovanna.
In 2008 Mondadori’s literary magazine Nuovi Argomenti selected Lerro as one of the poets to represent the new generation of poets born in the 1980s.

Work

Lerro has written several books of poetry and prose. Several of his works have been translated into other languages such as Poeme Alese.  He has also "visual poetry" including Ritagli, consisting of 30 canvases, shown in Berlin, Milan, Florence, Omignano, Vallo della Lucania and Salerno (Pinacoteca di Salerno, Santa Maria de Lama's church and ipogeo del Complesso Monumentale di San Pietro a Corte)

He produced the music CD I Battiti della Notte (Lerro-Krezymon) and in 2015 three concerts have been performed in Poland: Krakow, Warsaw and Gdańsk, organized by Italian Institute of Culture. In 2017 two concerts have been performed in Italy: Ascea and Salento. In 2019 the concert was given in Vallo della Lucania.

Empathic Movement / Empathism / New Manifesto of Arts
The Empathic Movement / Empathism (Italian: La Scuola Empatica / Empatismo) is a literary, artistic, philosophical and cultural movement born in Italy in 2020 within the ‘New Cultural Triangle of Ancient Cilento’: (Omignano – "The Aphorisms Village", Salento – "The Poetry Village", Vallo della Lucania – "Seat of Contemporary Arts Centre"). Starting with the values and ideas expressed in the New Manifesto of Arts written by Menotti Lerro and Antonello Pelliccia in 2018, this manifesto places empathy, the need to feel close, at the centre of the self, in contrast to previous views as isolated artists. It follows that any creative or didactic experimentation cannot be separated from a process of identification with other's  life stories. This horizon of meaning implies a civil promotion of the artistic society pouring from individual and community growth according to ethical purposes mediated by an aesthetic dimension: namely, that of art.

Cilento Poetry Prize

Lerro developed the Cilento Poetry Prize (Italian: Premio Cilento Poesia), an Italian literary prize founded in 2017 and awarded annually in Salento Cilento – "The Poetry Village". Some of the prize awardees include: 2017 – Davide Rondoni; 2018 – Milo de Angelis; 2019 – Franco Loi and Roberto Carifi (special winter edition at Accademia di Belle Arti di Brera); 2019 – Giampiero Neri and Vivian Lamarque; 2020 – Elio Pecora; 2021 – Dacia Maraini; 2022 - Valerio Magrelli and Tiziano Rossi. Prizes for criticism have been awarded to: 2018 – Francesco D'Episcopo; 2019 – Umberto Curi; 2020 – Remo Bodei

Awards and honors
Honorary citizen of Salento Cilento.
Honorary citizen of Omignano Cilento.
In 2016, he was awarded with a “Special Mention” in the three selected authors for literature for the Italian National Prize “100 Italian excellences”.
In 2018 he received the Giambattista Vico prize
In 2010 – "L'Aquilaia" prize
In 2010 – "Renata Canepa" prize
In 2015 – "CetonaVerde" prize
In 2018 – "Paolo Serra" prize

References

External links 

1980 births
Living people
Italian male poets
21st-century Italian poets
21st-century essayists
Male essayists
Italian male non-fiction writers
21st-century Italian male writers
Italian dramatists and playwrights
Italian male dramatists and playwrights
Aphorists
Italian male novelists
People from Salerno
Italian educators
People from Campania
Italian journalists
Italian male journalists
Italian male short story writers
Alumni of Oxford Brookes University
Alumni of the University of Reading
University of Salerno alumni